La Bâtie-Montsaléon is a commune in the Hautes-Alpes department in southeastern France.

It is notable for being the location of the Battle of Mons Seleucus in 353, when Constantius II defeated the usurper Magnentius.

Population

See also
Communes of the Hautes-Alpes department

References

Communes of Hautes-Alpes